ARINC 573 is an avionics data bus standard developed by ARINC. It is mostly used with Flight Data Recorder that use 12bit words in continuous data stream encoded in Harvard biphase.

See also 
 ARINC 717, a possible successor to Arinc 573

References 

ARINC standards
Serial buses